The TGV (Train à Grande Vitesse) is a high-speed rail service, which started operation in 1981.

This article is a list of all high-speed train services in France. This includes all international high-speed trains that make at least one station stop in France, as well as domestic high-speed trains. Most trains use the LGV network to attain the top speed of 320 km/h (200 mph), but many services also utilise the classic network to reach off-network destinations. 

All services are TGV services operated by SNCF, unless otherwise stated. Other operators that run high-speed trains in France include Eurostar, Ouigo, Renfe and Thalys.

International services

† = most or many trains call at this station.
‡ = few trains call at this station. 
• = most or many trains commence/terminate at this station.

Inter-regional services

† = most or many trains call at this station.
‡ = few trains call at this station. 
• = most or many trains commence/terminate at this station.

Intra-regional services

† = most or many trains call at this station.
‡ = few trains call at this station. 
• = most or many trains commence/terminate at this station.

Ouigo services

References 

Services
French railway-related lists